Tolpiodes is a genus of moths of the family Erebidae. The genus was erected by George Hampson in 1926.

Species
Tolpiodes aphanta (Turner, 1902) Queensland
Tolpiodes brunnescens (Rothschild, 1915) New Guinea
Tolpiodes discipuncta Hampson, 1926 New Guinea
Tolpiodes endolasia Hampson, 1926 New Guinea
Tolpiodes fasciata (Rothschild, 1913) New Guinea
Tolpiodes melanoproctis Hampson, 1926 Queensland
Tolpiodes micropis Hampson, 1926 New Guinea
Tolpiodes oligolasia Hampson, 1926 New South Wales

References

Calpinae
Noctuoidea genera